Nafisa or also spelled as Nafesa and Nafisah is an Arabic feminine given name meaning valuable, precious, extremely desired. Its literal meaning is “something so good and valuable that people compete for it”, derived from the N-F-S root (to breathe, to compete), which is mentioned in many places in the Quran.

People named Nafisa include:
Nafisa Ali, Indian actor-politician
Nafisa Joseph, Indian model
Nafisa Shah (born 1968), Pakistani politician
Nafisa Abdullahi, (born 1991) Nigerian Kannywood actress
Nafisa Abdullaeva (born 1978), Uzbekistan lawyer and business-coach
Nafisah Ahmad Zen Shahab, Indonesian businessperson

Arabic feminine given names